The Alabama Crimson Tide college football team competes as part of the National Collegiate Athletic Association (NCAA) Division I Football Bowl Subdivision (FBS), and represents the University of Alabama in the Western Division of the Southeastern Conference (SEC). The College Football Hall of Fame was established in 1951 to honor the careers of selected student-athletes who have competed in college football as either a player or coach. Since its inaugural class that year, Alabama has had 25 persons elected to the Hall of Fame as either a player or coach of the Crimson Tide.

The first Alabama inductees into the Hall of Fame were Don Hutson and Frank Thomas as part of the inaugural class in 1951. The most recent inductee was Sylvester Croom as part of the 2022 class.

Selections

Notes

References

Alabama Crimson Tide Hall of Fame